The Rheinisches Industriemuseum (lit. Rhineland Museum of the Industry) is a decentralized museum with six locations in Rhineland, western Germany. The locations are:
Oberhausen: the main site at the old Zinkfabrik Altenberg (zinc factory), near the Oberhausen main station
Ratingen: Textilfabrik Cromford (textiles factory), the first factory in continental Europe, named after the Cromford Mill
Solingen: Gesenkschmiede Hendrichs (forge)
Bergisch Gladbach: Papiermühle Alte Dombach (paper mill)
Engelskirchen: Ermen & Engels cotton spinning mill
Euskirchen: Tuchfabrik Müller (textile factory)

The owner of the museum is the Landschaftsverband Rheinland (LVR).

See also
LWL-Industriemuseum (formerly: Westfälisches Industriemuseum), lit. Westphalian Museum of the Industry

External links
  Rheinisches Industriemuseum
  the Textilfabrik Cromford/Cromford Spinning Mill in Ratingen
 Ermen & Engels (Engelskirchen) view in Google Earth

Museums in North Rhine-Westphalia
Technology museums in Germany
Science museums in Germany
Rhineland
Industry museums in Germany
Textile museums
Tourist attractions in Oberhausen